The European Association of Directory and Database Publishers, known as EADP, was founded in 1966. EADP is the key representative for the European directory and database publishing sector. As such, EADP has 180 members from 36 countries and represents the interests of some 340 directory publishers. The associations members and affiliate members include publishers and stakeholders from the industry such as suppliers and vendors. It is based in Brussels.

EADP's activities include:

 Maintaining an up-to-date member directory
 Facilitating an annual congress and a separate annual conference
 Monitoring EU legal activities of relevance to the industry
 Compiling an annual statistical report and benchmarking studies

The North American counterpart to the EADP is the Yellow Pages Association (YPA).

References

External links
YPA web-site 
EADP web-site

Trade associations based in Belgium
Directories
Organizations established in 1966